Erin Teschuk (born 25 October 1994) is a Canadian runner competing primarily in the 3000 metres steeplechase. She represented her country at the 2015 World Championships in Beijing without qualifying for the final. In July 2016 she was officially named to Canada's Olympic team.

NCAA
Erin Teschuk won 15 Summit League titles and 7 NCAA Division I All-American honours as a student-athlete at North Dakota State University.

Competition record

Personal bests
Outdoor
3000 metres steeplechase – 9:40.07 (Beijing 2015)

Indoor
1500 metres – 4:14.45 (New York 2016)
One mile – 4:32.35 (Fayetteville 2015)
3000 metres – 9:07.92 (Fayetteville 2015)
5000 metres – 16:01.69 (Bloomington 2015)

References

External links 

1994 births
Living people
Canadian female middle-distance runners
Canadian female steeplechase runners
World Athletics Championships athletes for Canada
Athletes (track and field) at the 2015 Pan American Games
Athletes from Winnipeg
Athletes (track and field) at the 2016 Summer Olympics
Olympic track and field athletes of Canada
Pan American Games track and field athletes for Canada